Lucien Mias (born September 29, 1930 in Saint-Germain-de-Calberte) is a former international rugby union player for France. His usual position was Lock. He captained the French team to win their first Five Nations Championship. Mias was inducted into the International Rugby Hall of Fame in 2005.

External links
 Player profile at Scrum.com

Living people
French rugby union players
Rugby union locks
France international rugby union players
World Rugby Hall of Fame inductees
1930 births